"Blind Pilots" is the second and final single to be taken from The Cooper Temple Clause's second album, Kick Up the Fire, and Let the Flames Break Loose.

Track listing
CD
"Blind Pilots" (album version)
"Derelict"
"I Want You to Think I Could Be"

DVD
DVD Audio (1), DVD Video (2-3)

"Blind Pilots" (album version)
18 minute making of Blind Pilots video feature
Director's cut of Blind Pilots video

7"
"Blind Pilots" (album version)
"Habit of a Lifetime"

Japanese EP
"Bllind Pilots" (radio edit)
"Derelict"
"Habit of a Lifetime"
"Did You Miss Me?" (live at Shepherd's Bush Empire on 22 November 2003)
"Written Apology" (live at Shepherd's Bush Empire on 22 November 2003)

German / International CD (Morning Records | 82876583882)
"Blind Pilots" (album version) – 4:01
"Habit of a Lifetime" – 3:30
"Derelict" – 4:17
"I Want You to Think I Could Be" – 6:26
"Blind Pilots (video, director's cut)" – 4:03
"Blind Pilots (making of the video)" – 18:02

Music video
The music video for "Blind Pilots" features Michael Fassbender in the role of a man who, engaged to his fiancée, goes out with friends for drinking and partying throughout the night, but unbeknownst to him, his girlfriend placed a talisman on a neckchain around his neck before he left. As he imbibes more alcohol with his friends, he begins turning into a satyr and his temperament leads him to become more harsh and isolated towards his friends until he leaves them for another club, where he completely turns into a satyr. He then gives into greater temptation around the female dancers at the strip club, but eventually experiences a more painful transformation as he rushes out, this time turning into a goat by the end of the video. The video is directed by Scott Lyon.

2003 singles
The Cooper Temple Clause songs
2003 songs